Among the people who have taught or studied at the Braunschweig University of Technology or its precursor, the Collegium Carolinum, are the following:

Natural sciences and mathematics
Ewald Banse — Geography
Ernst Otto Beckmann — Chemistry
August Wilhelm Heinrich Blasius — Zoology and Botany
Johann Heinrich Blasius — Zoology
Rudolf Blasius — Bacteriology
Caesar Rudolf Boettger — Zoology
Victor von Bruns — Medicine
Lorenz Florenz Friedrich von Crell — Chemistry and Metallurgy
Julius Wilhelm Richard Dedekind — Mathematics
Carl Georg Oscar Drude — Botany
Manfred Eigen — Biophysical chemistry — Nobel Prize in Chemistry 1967
Theodor Engelbrecht — Physiology
Herbert Freundlich — Chemistry
Robert Fricke — Mathematics
Kurt Otto Friedrichs — Mathematics
Karl Theophil Fries — Chemistry
Gustav Gassner — Botany
Carl Friedrich Gauß — Mathematics
Karl Heinrich Gräffe — Mathematics
Heiko Harborth — Mathematics
Wolfgang Hahn — Mathematics
Robert Hartig —  Forestry
Theodor Hartig —  Forestry
Johann Christian Ludwig Hellwig — Entomology
Adolph Henke — Pharmacology
Wilhelm Henneberg — Chemistry
Nikolaus Hofreiter — Mathematics
Johann Karl Wilhelm Illiger — Zoology
Henning Kagermann — Physics
Klaus von Klitzing — Physics — Nobel Prize in Physics 1985
Friedrich Ludwig Knapp — Chemistry
August Wilhelm Knoch — Physics
William F. Martin — Botany
Rainer Moormann — Physical chemistry
Justus Mühlenpfordt — Nuclear physics
Adolph Nehrkorn — Ornithology
Agnes Pockels — Chemistry
Friedrich Carl Alwin Pockels — Physics
Mark Ronan — Mathematics
Ferdinand Schneider — Chemistry
Gerhard Schrader — Chemistry
Kornelia Smalla — Chemistry
Sami Solanki — Astronomy
Hans Sommer — Mathematics
Ferdinand Tiemann — Chemistry
Heinrich Emil Timerding — Mathematics
Julius Tröger — Chemistry
Gerd Wedler — Chemistry
Christian Rudolph Wilhelm Wiedemann — Anatomy and Entomology
Arend Friedrich Wiegmann — Botany
Georg Wittig — Chemistry — Nobel Prize in Chemistry 1979
Eberhard August Wilhelm von Zimmermann — Zoogeography

Humanities and theology
Johann Joachim Eschenburg — Literary history
Ernst Ludwig Theodor Henke — Theology and Philosophy
Christoph Luetge — Philosophy
Willy Moog — Philosophy
Neal R. Norrick — English Linguistics
Werner Pöls — History
Nina Ruge — German language and literature
Gustav Anton von Seckendorff — Philosophy and Aesthetics
Gerhard Vollmer — Philosophy
Justus Friedrich Wilhelm Zachariae — Poetry

Social sciences
 Theodor Geiger — Sociology
 Jakob Mauvillon — Military science
 Ulrich Menzel — Political science
 Alfred Vierkandt — Ethnology and Sociology

Architecture, engineering sciences, and environmental sciences
Oliver Blume — Mechanical engineering
Adolf Busemann — Aerospace engineering
Heinrich Büssing — Engineering
Meinhard von Gerkan — Architecture
Walter Henn — Architecture
Friedrich Wilhelm Kraemer — Architecture
Boris Laschka — Aeronautical engineering
Erwin Otto Marx — Electrical engineering
Dieter Oesterlen — Architecture
August Orth — Architecture
Carl Theodor Ottmer — Architecture
Roland Rainer — Architecture
Ernst Sagebiel — Architecture
Hermann Schlichting — Aeronautical engineering
Kurt Tank — Aeronautical engineering
Constantin Uhde — Architecture
Friedrich Voss — Civil engineering
Ludwig Winter — Architecture

Fine arts
 Carl Friedrich Echtermeier — Sculpture
 Gottlieb Elster — Sculpture
 Georg Ferdinand Howaldt — Sculpture

Brunswick
People
TU Braunschweig